Károly Molter (2 December 1890 – 30 November 1981) was a Hungarian novelist, dramatist, literary critic, journalist and academic. He spent most of his life in the region of Transylvania, being successively a national of Austria-Hungary and Romania.

Biography
Born in Óverbász (Vrbas), Vojvodina region, Molter was from an ethnic German (Danube Swabian) family, but adopted Hungarian as his language. He studied at the College of Kecskemét, and then at the University of Budapest Faculty of Philosophy in Letter (the Hungarian-German section).

In 1913, he moved to Transylvania, settling down in Marosvásárhely (Târgu Mureş). Between 1913 and 1945, he was a teacher in the Bolyai Gymnasium, a Reformed Church college in the city. In the interwar period, after the union of Transylvania with Romania, he became a member of the Erdélyi Helikon group in Marosvécs (Brâncoveneşti), as well as sitting on the editorial staff of Zord Idő magazine. In 1937, he published one of his most successful works, the novel Tibold Márton, which depicted a Swabian family in the process of adopting Hungarian culture, as well as the problems faced by ethnic minorities in their relation to the majority.

After 1945, Molter was employed by the Bolyai faculty in Cluj, where he lectured in German language and literature. Retiring in 1950, he moved back to Târgu Mureș, and died there 31 years later.

Works
 F. m. Melánia R. T. (1929)
 Tibold Márton (1937)
 Bolond kisváros ("Foolish Little Town", 1942)
 Reformáció és magyar műveltség ("Reformation and the Hungarian Culture", 1944)
 Harci mosolyok ("Martial Smiles", 1956; short stories)
 Iparkodj kisfiam! ("Struggle, My Little Son!", 1964)
 Szellemi belháború ("The Intellectual Interwar", 1968)
 Komor korunk derűje ("The Brightness in Our Somber Times", 1971; anecdotes)
 Örökmozgó ("Perpetual Motion", 1974; plays)
 Buborékharc ("Bubble War", 1980; essays)

References

Further reading
 László Ablonczy, Molter Károly XC., 1980
 György Beke, Molter Károly hagyatéka ("The Bequest of Károly Molter"), 1982
 Ildikó Marosi,
Molter Károly, 1974
Molter Károly levelezése ("Károly Molter's Correspondence"), 1995
 Pál Sőni, Molter Károly, 1981
 Lajos Szakolczay, Egy gazdag életút ("A Rich Lifetime"), 1970
 János Szász, A Molter példa érvényessége ("The Present-day Relevancy of the Molter Example"), 1986
 Áron Tóbiás, Molter Károlynál Marosvásárhelyen ("At Károly Molter's Home in Târgu Mureș"), 1989
 Tibor Tószegi, Molter Károly kilencvenéves ("Károly Molter at Age 90"), 1980

1890 births
1981 deaths
People from Vrbas, Serbia
Romanian dramatists and playwrights
Romanian essayists
Romanian journalists
Romanian literary critics
Romanian male novelists
Romanian schoolteachers
Romanian male short story writers
Romanian short story writers
Danube-Swabian people
Hungarian-language writers
Academic staff of Babeș-Bolyai University
Male dramatists and playwrights
20th-century Romanian novelists
20th-century Romanian dramatists and playwrights
Male essayists
20th-century short story writers
20th-century essayists
20th-century Romanian male writers
20th-century journalists